Malegaon Bazar is a village, in Telhara tehsil of Akola district, Maharashtra State,  India.

Geography

Demographics
 India census, Malegaon Bazar had a population of 1410.

Description 
The town post office Postal Index Number ( PIN code) is 444108 and PIN is shared with Telhara, Belkhed, Panchagavan post offices.

Nearby towns are Sonala, Akot, Sangrampur, Jalgaon Jamod, Telhara, Shegaon

References

Villages in Akola district